The following is a list of notable events and releases of the year 1998 in Norwegian music.

Events

February
 16 – The 1st Polarjazz started in Longyearbyen, Svalbard (February 16 – 18).

April
 3 – The 25th Vossajazz started in Voss, Norway (April 3 – 5).

May
 6 – The 9th MaiJazz started in Stavanger, Norway (May 6 – 10).
 20 – The 26th Nattjazz started in Bergen, Norway (May 20 – 31).

June
 6 – The Norwegian Wood started in Oslo, Norway (June 6 – 7).

July
 13 – The 38th Moldejazz started in Molde, Norway (July 13 – 18).

August
 12 – The 12th Sildajazz started in Haugesund, Norway (August 12 – 16).
 26 – The last Kalvøyafestivalen was canceled at Kalvøya near by Oslo.

Albums released

October
 5 – Rites (ECM Records), by Jan Garbarek

Unknown date

B
 Jon Balke
 Saturation (Jazzland Recordings)
 Rotor (Curling Legs), with Cikada String Quartet
 Ketil Bjørnstad
 The Sea II (ECM Recordings), with David Darling, Jon Christensen, and Terje Rypdal

K
 Bjørn Kruse
 Song For Winter (Works For Choir) (Aurora  Records)

Deaths 

 May
 20 – Robert Normann, jazz guitarist (born 1916).

 June
 14 – Hans W. Brimi, fiddler and farmer (born 1917).

 December
 4 – Egil «Bop» Johansen, jazz drummer (born 1934).

Births 

 April
 25 – Ella Marie Hætta Isaksen, Sami singer and yoiker.

See also
 1998 in Norway
 Music of Norway
 Norway in the Eurovision Song Contest 1998

References

 
Norwegian music
Norwegian
Music
1990s in Norwegian music